Events from the year 1622 in Ireland.

Incumbent
Monarch: James I

Events
 A royal commission of inquiry into the Dublin Castle administration is sent from England, headed by Dudley Digges and including James Perrot.
18 April – Oliver St John surrenders the office of Lord Deputy of Ireland. He has served since 1616.
3 May – Hugh Montgomery is created 1st Viscount Montgomery, of the Great Ardes, in the Peerage of Ireland.
18 September – Henry Cary, 1st Viscount Falkland, is sworn in as Lord Deputy of Ireland.
Thomas Dease is consecrated Roman Catholic Bishop of Meath, returning to Ireland from Paris.
Frederick Hamilton is given lands in Leitrim.

Births

Deaths
10 November – Henry Folliott, 1st Baron Folliott, settled in and developed Ballyshannon area (b. c.1568)
14 November – Miler Magrath, Church of Ireland Archbishop of Cashel since 1571 and Roman Catholic Bishop of Down and Connor 1565–1580 (sic.) (b. c.1523)
Henry MacShane O'Neill - Irish flaith and son of Shane O'Neill.

References

 
1620s in Ireland
Ireland
Years of the 17th century in Ireland